Teton or The Tetons may refer to:
Teton Basin or Teton Valley, today's names of historic trapper meeting and battle site (1832)
Teton Range, part of the Rocky Mountains in Wyoming
Grand Teton, the tallest mountain in the Teton Range
Grand Teton National Park, the United States National Park situated around the range
Teton Pass, a high mountain pass located at the southern end of the Teton Range 
Teton River (Idaho), a river near the Teton Range
Teton Dam, a dam in the Teton River that collapsed soon after it was built
Teton River (Montana)
Teton Sioux Indian Tribe or Titonwan and Lakota
Teton Gravity Research

Places
Teton, Idaho
Teton, South Dakota
Teton County, Montana
Teton County, Idaho
Teton County, Wyoming

People
Carrie Cornplanter (1887–1918), Seneca name "Téton," artist active in the 1900s